The Belarusian Premier League is the top level women's football league of Belarus. The champion of  the league qualifies for a spot in the UEFA Women's Champions League.

Format
In 2009 teams in the league played each other twice. In the 2010 season the teams play each other three times.

In 2008 there were two playoff groups after the regular season. Teams 1 to 4 and 5 to 8 played a double round robin (so 6 additional matches).

Teams
The 2021 season is made up by the following teams.

List of champions 
A list of all champions.
 1992 Nadezhda Mahilyou
 1993 Nadezhda Mahilyou
 1994 Trikotazhnitsa Babruisk
 1995 Viktoriya Brest
 1996 Belkar Babruisk
 1997 Babruichanka Babruisk
 1998 Babruichanka Babruisk
 1999 Babruichanka Babruisk
 2000 Babruichanka Babruisk
 2001 Babruichanka Babruisk
 2002 Babruichanka Babruisk
 2003 Babruichanka Babruisk
 2004 Babruichanka Babruisk
 2005 Universitet Vitebsk
 2006 Universitet Vitebsk
 2007 Zorka BDU
 2008 Universitet Vitebsk
 2009 Universitet Vitebsk
 2010 Babruichanka Babruisk
 2011 Babruichanka Babruisk
 2012 Babruichanka Babruisk
 2013 FC Minsk
 2014 FC Minsk
 2015 FC Minsk
 2016 FC Minsk
 2017 FC Minsk
 2018 FC Minsk
 2019 FC Minsk
 2020 Dinamo Minsk

Record Champions

References

External links
 Official Site
 League at uefa.com
 League at women.soccerway.com

Top level women's association football leagues in Europe
1
Summer association football leagues
Women
Women's sports leagues in Belarus
Football
Professional sports leagues in Belarus